Mack-Belk House is a historic home located at Fort Mill, York County, South Carolina. It consists of a one-story rear section built in the 1860s, with a two-story, three bay, brick main block built about 1890.  It features a one-story, hip roofed wraparound porch with Late Victorian design elements.

It was added to the National Register of Historic Places in 1992.

References

Houses on the National Register of Historic Places in South Carolina
Victorian architecture in South Carolina
Houses completed in 1890
Houses in York County, South Carolina
National Register of Historic Places in York County, South Carolina